Formocortal (INN), also known as fluoroformylone, is a corticosteroid used in dermatology and ophthalmology.

It was introduced in around 1970 and is not known to be marketed .

See also 
 Glucocorticoid

References 

Acetate esters
Acetonides
Secondary alcohols
Chloroarenes
Corticosteroid cyclic ketals
Corticosteroids
Corticosteroid esters
Fluoroarenes
Glucocorticoids